Pazhani Swami is one of the master performers in Irula dance of Irula tribal community and an actor in Malayalam movie industry. He is the leader of Azad Kala Sangham, a prominent troupe from Attappadi which performs Irula dance of tribal community of Kerala. One of this troupe member Nanjiyamma’s song 'Kalakkatha' in Malayalam movie Ayyappanum Koshiyum gone viral.

Awards and Recognitions 
Pazhani Swami is a popular Irula dance artist. He was honored by P. K. Jayalakshmi the Minister for Welfare of Backward Communities in the state Government of Kerala at the National Tribal Fest held at Valliyurkavu Mananthavady of Wayanad on 2012. He received the 'Young Pratibha Folklore Award' by the Kerala Folklore Academy on 2015. He gets the Kerala Chief Minister's 'Distinguished Service Award' in 2018 as a worker in the Kerala Forest and Wildlife Department. Azad Kala Sangham is performing the Irula dance in various cities of India like Mumbai and Delhi.

Filmography

Personal life 
He is from the Irula community and lives in Choriyannoor tribal village in Attappadi of Palakkad district with his wife Shobha and two children, Anu Prashobhini and Adithyan. He is an officer in Kerala Forest and Wildlife Department at Mannarghat division of Palghat district.

References 

Living people
Male actors in Malayalam cinema
Indian male film actors
Scheduled Tribes of Kerala
1979 births